Megacraspedus dolosellus is a moth of the family Gelechiidae. It was described by Zeller in 1839. It is found in Spain, France, Austria, Italy, the Czech Republic, Slovakia, Albania, Bosnia and Herzegovina, Hungary, Romania, Bulgaria, North Macedonia, Ukraine and Russia.

References

Moths described in 1839
Megacraspedus